Saint-Georges may refer to:

People
Joseph Bologne, Chevalier de Saint-Georges French composer and violinist
Jules-Henri Vernoy de Saint-Georges French librettist

Places

In Canada
Saint-Georges, Quebec, a city in the Beauce-Sartigan Regional County Municipality
Saint-Georges-de-Windsor, Quebec, a municipality
Saint-Georges River (rivière au Chêne tributary), a river in Quebec

In England 
 St. Georges, North Somerset

In France
Saint-Georges (Paris Métro), a railway station in the 9th arrondissement
Saint-Georges, Lyon, a neighbourhood of Lyon
Saint-Georges, Cantal, in the Cantal département 
Saint-Georges, Charente, in the Charente département 
Saint-Georges, Gers, in the Gers département
Saint-Georges, French Guiana, or Saint-Georges-de-l'Oyapock, in the Guyane (French Guiana) département
Saint-Georges, Lot-et-Garonne, in the Lot-et-Garonne  département
Saint-Georges, Moselle, in the Moselle département 
Saint-Georges, Pas-de-Calais, in the Pas-de-Calais  département 
Saint-Georges, Tarn-et-Garonne, in the Tarn-et-Garonne département 
Saint-Georges-Antignac, in the Charente-Maritime  département 
Saint-Georges-Armont, in the Doubs département 
Saint-Georges-Blancaneix, in the Dordogne département 
Saint-Georges-Buttavent, in the Mayenne département 
Saint-Georges-d'Annebecq, in the Orne département 
Saint Georges d'Aunay, in the Calvados département 
Saint-Georges-d'Aurac, in the Haute-Loire  département 
Saint-Georges-de-Baroille, in the Loire département 
Saint-Georges-de-Bohon, in the Manche département 
Saint-Georges-de-Chesné, in the Ille-et-Vilaine  département 
Saint-Georges-de-Commiers, in the Isère  département 
Saint-Georges-de-Didonne, in the Charente-Maritime  département 
Saint-Georges-de-Gréhaigne, in the Ille-et-Vilaine  département 
Saint-Georges-de-la-Couée, in the Sarthe département 
Saint-Georges-de-la-Rivière, in the Manche département 
Saint-Georges-de-Lévéjac, in the Lozère  département
Saint-Georges-de-Livoye, in the Manche département 
Saint-Georges-d'Elle, in the Manche département 
Saint-Georges-de-Longuepierre, in the Charente-Maritime  département 
Saint-Georges-de-Luzençon, in the Aveyron département 
Saint-Georges-de-Mons, in the Puy-de-Dôme  département 
Saint-Georges-de-Montaigu, in the Vendée  département
Saint-Georges-de-Montclard, in the Dordogne département 
Saint-Georges-de-Noisné, in the Deux-Sèvres  département 
Saint-Georges-de-Pointindoux, in the Vendée  département 
Saint-Georges-de-Poisieux, in the Cher  département 
Saint-Georges-de-Reintembault, in the Ille-et-Vilaine  département 
Saint-Georges-de-Reneins, in the Rhône  département 
Saint-Georges-de-Rex, in the Deux-Sèvres  département 
Saint-Georges-de-Rouelley, in the Manche département 
Saint-Georges-des-Agoûts, in the Charente-Maritime  département 
Saint-Georges-des-Coteaux, in the Charente-Maritime  département 
Saint-Georges-des-Gardes, in the Maine-et-Loire  département 
Saint-Georges-des-Groseillers, in the Orne département 
Saint-Georges-des-Hurtières, in the Savoie département 
Saint-Georges-d'Espéranche, in the Isère  département

In Grenada
St. George's, Grenada

In Montserrat
Saint Georges Parish, Montserrat

In the United States
Saint Georges, Delaware

See also
Saint George (disambiguation)